Jentezen Franklin is an American evangelical pastor, author, and televangelist. He is the senior pastor of Free Chapel, a multi-site church based in Gainesville, Georgia and author of Right People, Right Place, Right Plan; Fasting; Fear Fighters and The Spirit of Python.  His messages influence generations through modern day technology and digital media, his televised broadcast, Kingdom Connection, and outreaches that put God’s love and compassion into action. Jentezen is also a New York Times bestselling author who speaks at conferences worldwide. He and his wife, Cherise, live in Gainesville, Georgia, and have five children and four grandchildren.

Ministry 
On his way to a musical career as a saxophone player Franklin became an evangelist. After Roy Wellborn, senior pastor of Free Chapel, died in 1989, Franklin was installed as pastor of Free Chapel.  At the time, Free Chapel was a small congregation of 300 people. In 2004 the church moved to a new location which has a 3,000-seat auditorium.

Personal life 
Franklin and his wife Cherise married in September 1987.

Published works 
 Fasting: (Volume I) Private Discipline That Brings Public Reward (2004)
 Fasting: (Volume II) Opening A Door To God's Promises (2005)
Take Hold Of Your Dreams 
 The Amazing Discernment of Women: Learning to Understand Your Spiritual Intuition And God's Plan for It (2006)
 Right People, Right Place, Right Plan (2007)
 Right People, Right Place, Right Plan Devotional: 30 Days of Discerning the Voice of God (2008)
 Fasting: Opening the door to a deeper, more intimate, more powerful relationship with God (2008)
 Fasting Journal: Your Personal 21-Day Guide to a Successful Fast (2008)
 Believe That You Can (2008)
 Fasting Study Guide: 5-Week Interactive Study Resource (2009)
 Fear Fighters: How to Live with Confidence in a World Driven by Fear (2009)
 Right People Right Place Right Plan (2011)
 The Fasting Edge: Recover your passion. Recapture your dream. Restore your joy. (2011)
 Fasting Student Edition: Go Deeper and Further with God Than Ever Before (2012)
 The Spirit of Python: Exposing Satan's Plan to Squeeze the Life Out of You (2013)
  Love Like You’ve Never Been Hurt (2018)
  Acres of Diamonds: Discovering God’s Best Right Where You Are (2020)

See also

Fasting

References

External links
JentezenFranklin.org Jentezen Franklin Media Ministries

1962 births
Living people
American evangelicals
American Pentecostal pastors
American television evangelists
Pentecostals from Georgia (U.S. state)
Pentecostal writers